This is a list of civil parishes in the ceremonial county of Hampshire, England. There are 268 civil parishes.

Population figures are unavailable for some of the smallest parishes.

The following former districts are unparished: the Basingstoke Municipal Borough,  Fareham Urban District, Gosport Municipal Borough, Havant and Waterloo Urban District, Southsea Civil Parish, Portsmouth County Borough, Aldershot Municipal Borough, Farnborough Urban District, Southampton County Borough and Winchester Municipal Borough. This includes the whole of the modern districts of: Rushmoor, Southampton, Portsmouth, Havant, Gosport and Fareham.

See also
 List of civil parishes in England

References

External links
 Office for National Statistics : Geographical Area Listings
 Basingstoke and Deane Borough Council : Parish Council Contacts

Hampshire
 
Civil parishes
Civil parishes